The 2018–19 BBL season was the 32nd campaign of the British Basketball League since the league's establishment in 1987. The season featured 12 teams from across England and Scotland.

The Leicester Riders were the three-time defending regular season champions, but were unable to defend that title as the London Lions achieved their first regular season title; a 99–80 victory at the Newcastle Eagles, on 26 April 2019, was enough for the Lions to have an unassailable lead ahead of the Riders. It was the Lions' second trophy of the season, after they defeated the Glasgow Rocks in the BBL Cup final.

The Lions were beaten in the playoff quarter-finals by the eighth-seeded Plymouth Raiders, who overturned a six-point deficit from the first leg into an eight-point aggregate victory. The Raiders were then beaten by the Riders in the semi-finals, before the Riders won their third consecutive playoff final with a 93–61 victory over the London City Royals, who in their first season in the league, had won the BBL Trophy in overtime against the Lions.

Teams

The newly formed London City Royals replaced Leeds Force.

Venues

Personnel and sponsoring

Coaching changes

Regular season
The winners of the Regular season are considered as national champions. The London Lions achieved their first regular season title with a 99–80 victory over the Newcastle Eagles at the Eagles Community Arena on 26 April 2019.

Standings

Results

Double round-robin

Single round-robin

Playoffs

Bracket

Quarter-finals
The quarter-final matchups and tip-off times were confirmed by the league, on 28 April 2019.

(1) London Lions vs. (8) Plymouth Raiders

(2) Leicester Riders vs. (7) Cheshire Phoenix

(3) Newcastle Eagles vs. (6) Sheffield Sharks

(4) London City Royals vs. (5) Glasgow Rocks

Semi-finals

(2) Leicester Riders vs. (8) Plymouth Raiders

(4) London City Royals vs. (6) Sheffield Sharks

Final: (2) Leicester Riders vs. (4) London City Royals

BBL Cup

BBl Trophy

British clubs in European competitions
British clubs returned to European competitions eleven years after their last participation.

See also
2018–19 BBL Cup
2018–19 BBL Trophy

Notes

References

External links

British Basketball League seasons
1
British